Temple of Terror is a video game published by Adventure Soft in 1987 for the Commodore 64 and ZX Spectrum.

Gameplay
Temple of Terror is an adaptation of the Fighting Fantasy gamebook, Temple of Terror.

Reception
Zzap!64 reviewed the game, rating it 35% overall, and stated that "I have to admit that they show very little advance in design or content over, for example, The Hulk - or even some of the earlier titles like Adventureland.  Come on boys, we're in the Infocom Age, not the Stone Age ..."

Reviews
Crash! (Jul, 1987)
Commodore Computing International (Sep, 1987)
Computer and Video Games (Aug, 1987)
Your Sinclair (Aug, 1987)
Sinclair User (Jul, 1987)

References

1987 video games
Adventure games
Adventure Soft games
Commodore 64 games
Single-player video games
Video games based on novels
Video games developed in the United Kingdom
ZX Spectrum games